John Lawrence Federovitch (June 26, 1917 – January 20, 2003) was a professional American football player who played offensive lineman for two seasons for the Chicago Bears.

References

1917 births
American football offensive linemen
Chicago Bears players
2003 deaths
American people of Slavic descent
People from Westmoreland County, Pennsylvania
Players of American football from Pennsylvania